Mas'uda al-Wizkitiya (died 1591), known popularly in Morocco as Lala 'Auda and in Western sources as Lalla Masuda, was a Moroccan political figure in the Saadi Dynasty. She is remembered for her humanitarian, charity, political, and development work. She was the wife of the Saadian Sultan Mohammed al-Shaykh and mother of their son Sultan Ahmad al-Mansur. 

Lalla Masuda was the daughter of the prince of the qasba of Warzazat, Sheikh Abu al-'Abaas Ahmed bin Abdellah al-Wizkiti al-Warzazi, who had a hand in establishing Saadian control over the Sous-Dra'a region. She is considered a waliya, or saint.

Name
Mas'uda al-Wizkitiya is popularly remembered as Lala 'Auda, meaning the Lady of Return, as she would often travel through remote areas in the countryside bringing auspice and fortune. She has also been called as-Sayida al-Hurra (the Free Lady) and the Phoenix of the Sahara.

Biography
She established mosques and Quranic schools, including the Bab Doukkala Mosque. The Lala 'Auda Mosque in Meknes, also carries her name, as does the adjacent Lalla 'Auda Square.

She also set out to improve roads within the kingdom, particularly in rural areas to connect them with urban centers to give them access to essential services, such as healthcare and education. She is credited with building the bridge over the Um ar-Rabii'a River.

She also provided administrative counsel to her son Ahmad al-Mansur. She recommended, for example, that he seek help from the Ottoman sultan, Selim I.

She supported impoverished communities in rural areas through economic assistance and support for small businesses. She also facilitated the marriage of young people to strengthen those communities. She helped these young people exercise the right to marriage and family life by helping them secure dowries, marriage costs, and other financial burdens preventing them from getting married. 

She had a noted propensity for documentation, meticulously documenting her activities and charitable donations.

The Lalla Masuda Qubba is the oldest part of the Saadian Tombs in Marrakesh.

The Marrakshi historian Al-Abbas bin Ibrahim as-Samlali recorded in his encyclopedia Information About the Notables of Marrakesh and Aghmat:

References

Advisors
Saadi dynasty
Philanthropists
16th-century Moroccan people
16th-century Moroccan women
Spouses of sultans